Monosis is a genus of Asian plants in the Vernonieae within the daisy family.

 Species

 formerly included
species now regarded as members of other genera: Critoniopsis Eremanthus Eremosis Gymnanthemum Vernonia

References

Vernonieae
Asteraceae genera